Lee Jae-hyeon (Hangul: 이재현) (born February 2, 2003, in Seoul) is a South Korean pitcher for the Samsung Lions in the Korea Baseball Organization (KBO).

References 

Samsung Lions players
KBO League infielders
South Korean baseball players
2003 births
Living people